Paraphernalia most commonly refers to a group of apparatus, equipment, or furnishing used for a particular activity.

Paraphernalia may also refer to:
Drug paraphernalia, any equipment, product, or material that is used to consume or distribute drugs for recreational usage
A variety of tools and artifacts considered collectively
Memorabilia and other collectibles
Regalia, the privileges and insignia, characteristic of a Sovereign or Emperor
Paraphernalia (album), an album by Enuff Z'nuff
"Paraphernalia", a 2020 song by the band Temples
Paraphernalia, a jazz group fronted by saxophonist-flautist Barbara Thompson
Paraphernalia, a book and DVD by the Italian pianist and composer Alessandra Celletti